Springsnail may refer to:

Alamosa springsnail
Brown springsnail
Bruneau hot springsnail
Chupadera springsnail
Crystal Spring springsnail
Davis County springsnail
Diamond Y springsnail
Distal-gland springsnail
Elongate-gland springsnail
Fairbanks springsnail
Gila springsnail
Grand Wash springsnail
Huachuca springsnail
Idaho springsnail
Jackson lake springsnail
Median-gland Nevada springsnail
Montezuma Well springsnail
Naegele springsnail
Oasis Valley springsnail
Page springsnail
Roswell springsnail
San Bernardino springsnail
Socorro springsnail
South Sierra Nevada springsnail
Three forks springsnail
Verde Rim springsnail